The 1984 season of the Cook Islands Round Cup was the fifteenth recorded season of top flight association football competition in the Cook Islands, with any results between 1951 and 1969 currently unknown. Titikaveka won the championship, their fourteenth recorded championship, and fourth in a row following a run of nine consecutive titles in the 1970s.

Results

League table
Matavera topped the group stage which was played on a round robin basis.

Knockout stage

Semi finals

Final

References

Cook Islands Round Cup seasons
Cook
football